Neoephemera purpurea is a species of large squaregill mayfly in the family Neoephemeridae. It is found in North America.

References

Mayflies
Articles created by Qbugbot
Insects described in 1931